Joaquín "Chano" García (1903 – death date unknown) was a Cuban infielder in the Negro leagues and Cuban League in the 1920s.

A native of Caibarién, Cuba, García made his Negro leagues debut in 1926 with the Bacharach Giants, and played in all 11 games of the 1926 Colored World Series for the Bacharach club. The following season, he played for the Lincoln Giants. García also played in the Cuban League for the Almendares club.

References

External links
 and Seamheads

1903 births
Date of birth missing
Year of death missing
Place of death missing
Almendares (baseball) players
Bacharach Giants players
Lincoln Giants players
Cuban baseball players
Baseball infielders
People from Caibarién